Pilotto syndrome is a rare syndrome which affects the face, heart, and back. The syndrome can cause a cleft lip and palate, scoliosis, and mental retardation. The Office of Rare Diseases and National Institutes of Health have classified this syndrome as affecting less than 200,000 people in the United States.

References

External links 

Congenital disorders
Rare syndromes